The University of Tasmania Conservatorium of Music offers students an integrated music education based on best international contemporary arts practice.

Education structure
The Tasmanian Conservatorium of Music forms part of the faculty of Arts at the University of Tasmania.

The Conservatorium offers professional education and training in classical and contemporary music in the Undergraduate Courses leading to the Diploma of Music and Bachelor of Music awards, and beyond in the Postgraduate Coursework awards. Research Higher Degree awards may involve research into contemporary performance, including cross-arts, multimedia performance, and explorations of new music technologies, and in traditional applied instrumental and composition areas. The school has a performance program through its various ensembles including the ARIA award nominated Southern Gospel Choir, Australian International Symphony Orchestra Institute, Jan Sedivka Camerata, and The Discovery Orchestra.

It provides a dynamic and progressive music-making environment that meets individual student needs through intensive one-to-one tuition, small class size and personalized attention. Students are offered a broad choice of subject areas and specializations, enabling them to direct their own learning in pursuit of individual career interests and goals. Live music-making is at the core of the Conservatorium's activities. Professional flexibility is encouraged and is implemented through a range of student projects into the broader community and extensive collaboration with professional organizations in Tasmania and nationally.

Mission
The University of Tasmania Conservatorium of Music acknowledges a responsibility to provide programs and opportunities for developing traditional music craft to a high level, while also reflecting the changing nature of contemporary music practice. Its particular strengths lie in the fields of composition and performance.

Expansion and reforms 
Since 2000, the Conservatorium has expanded to include the expansion into new areas of study such as Rock Studies and Time-based Multimedia to complement its already-established programs in Classical Music, Jazz and Music Education.

Directors and Heads of School 
Rex Hobcroft - Founding Director 1964-1971
Jan Sedivka - Director 1971-1982
David Cubbin - Director 1985-1989
Don Kay - Acting Director 1990 to 1993
Simone de Haan - Director 1994 to 1996
Raffaele Marcellino - Acting Director 1996 to 1998
Christian Wojtowicz - Acting Director 1998 to 1999
Douglas Knehans - Director 2000 - June 2008
Andrew Legg - Acting Head of School June 2008 - January 2009
Kevin Purcell - Head of School 2009 - September 2010
Andrew Legg - Acting Head of School, September 2010 - November 2011; Head of School, November 2011 - Current

Notable alumni

Matthew Dewey
Constantine Koukias
Michael Lampard
Geoffrey Lancaster
William Lane
Andrew Legg
Raffaele Marcellino
Ian Williams

External links 
 Tasmanian Conservatorium of Music
 Australian International Symphony Orchestra Institute
 www.thediscoveryorchestra.com.au

Music schools in Australia
Organisations based in Tasmania
Schools and Faculties of the University of Tasmania